The 1959 Arlington State Rebels football team was an American football team that represented Arlington State College (now known as the University of Texas at Arlington) as an independent during the 1959 NCAA College Division football season. In their seventh year under head coach Chena Gilstrap, the team compiled a 4–3 record. In April 1959 the Texas legislature approved the transition of Arlington State from a two-year junior college, to a four-year senior college. As such, 1959 marked the first season the Rebels competed as an NCAA College Division independent.

Schedule

References

Arlington State
Texas–Arlington Mavericks football seasons
Arlington State Rebels football